The 1935 Canadian federal election was held on October 14, 1935, to elect members  of the House of Commons of Canada of the 18th Parliament of Canada. The Liberal Party of William Lyon Mackenzie King won a majority government, defeating Prime Minister R. B. Bennett's Conservatives.

The central issue was the economy, which was still in the depths of the Great Depression. In office since the 1930 election, Bennett had sought to stimulate the economy during his first few years through a policy of high tariffs and trade within the British Empire. In the last months of his time in office, he reversed his position, copying the popular New Deal of Franklin Roosevelt in the United States.  Upset about high unemployment and inaction by the federal government, voters were unwilling to allow the Conservatives to continue to govern, despite their change of policy.

The Conservatives were also suffering severe internal divisions.  During his first years in office, Bennett had alienated those in his party who supported intervention in the economy.  His last minute conversion to interventionism alienated the rest of the party. Former cabinet minister H.H. Stevens left to form the Reconstruction Party.  Senior minister Sir Joseph Flavelle announced he would be supporting the Liberals.

Voters opted for Mackenzie King's promise of mild reforms to restore economic health.  The Liberals crushed the Tories, winning 173 seats to the Conservatives' 39, the worst ever performance by the Tories until their collapse in 1993. The Liberal Party would continue to hold power until 1957.

The 1935 election was also important in it saw the final demise of the Progressive Party and the United Farmers of Alberta.  Two new movements rose out of the west, however.  The new Co-operative Commonwealth Federation, a social democratic party, first competed in this election and won seven seats, promising social reform.

The Social Credit Party of Canada was even more successful, capturing seventeen seats on its platform of monetary reform despite winning less of the popular vote than the former. Fifteen of these seats were in Alberta, where the party dominated after having swept to power in a landslide less than two months before the federal vote. John Horne Blackmore was chosen to lead the Social Credit caucus after the election. The de facto leader of the national movement was Alberta Premier William Aberhart, who did not stand in the federal election himself.

National results 

Notes:

* The party did not nominate candidates in the previous election.

x - less than 0.005% of the popular vote

Vote and seat summaries

Results by province 

xx - less than 0.05% of the popular vote

See also
 
List of Canadian federal general elections
List of political parties in Canada
18th Canadian Parliament

Further reading
 
 H. Blair Neatby, William Lyon Mackenzie King: 1932-1939 (1976)

Notes

References

 
 Federal
1935
October 1935 events